Jerrold Electronics was an American provider of cable television equipment, including subscriber converter boxes, distribution network equipment (amplifiers, multitap outlets), and headend equipment in the United States.

History
The company was founded by future Pennsylvania governor Milton Jerrold Shapp (the company name was derived from his middle name) in 1950. The company was one of the earliest pioneers of community antenna television systems (cable television).  The company headquarters was located at 401 Walnut Street in Philadelphia, Pennsylvania.

Shapp sold the company to General Instrument in 1967. However, the Jerrold brand name continued to be used on equipment into the 1990s.

In the late 1990s, the Jerrold name went out of use, and General Instrument merged with Motorola becoming the Motorola Connected Home Solutions division. Motorola Connected Home Solutions was acquired by Arris in 2012. The equipment was popular with many cable pirates by then and by 2005, most cable companies have discontinued use of Jerrold equipment in favor of digital cable.

See also
Cable television in the United States
Keneth Alden Simons

Notes

References
There are a number of sources available covering the history of Jerrold and the cable industry as a whole.
 Parsons, P. Blue Skies: A History of Cable Television Temple University Press, 2008
Extensive history
 Stubbs, G. From workhorse to icon. The 704 Jerrold Field Strength Meter CED Magazine, November/December 2004, p. 42
History of one notable instrument
 Taylor, A.S. History Between Their Ears: Recollections of Pioneer CATV Engineers The Cable Center, 2000
 Histories of key engineering staff  involved

External links
  NCTA (National Cable & Telecommunications Association) History of Cable Television. Washington, DC 2001 
Brief narrative history
  United States: Cable Television The Museum of Broadcast Communications 2001
Extensive, well documented
  Young, C. ''RFMD. CATV Hybrid Amplifier Modules: Past, Present, Future’’ (RFMD Greensboro 2009)
History of CATV amplifier development

1950 establishments in Pennsylvania
2012 establishments in Pennsylvania
American companies established in 1950
Electronics companies established in 1950
Companies disestablished in 2012
Cable television in the United States
Defunct companies based in Pennsylvania
Companies based in Philadelphia
Electronics companies of the United States